The acronym WSI may refer to:

 Wafer-scale integration, a technique for building large integrated circuits
 Wall Street Institute, the former name of Wall Street English, an English language education company
 Walter Schottky Institute, a research center at the Technical University of Munich
 Water Safety Instructor, a person qualified to teach swimming lessons
 Weather Services International, a sister company to The Weather Channel, specializing in weather data and software
 Weather Stress Index, a relative measure of weather conditions
 Web Services Interoperability, Organization (WS-I), computer industry consortium
 Western Sydney Airport – the IATA code of this under-construction airport in Sydney
 Western Sydney Institute of TAFE, college institute in New South Wales
 Winter Soldier Investigation, inquiry into war crimes resulting from United States policies in the Vietnam War
 Wojskowe Służby Informacyjne, Poland's former military intelligence services
 World Security Institute, think-tank for independent research and journalism on global affairs
 World Sindhi Institute, a human rights organization based in Washington, D.C., United States
 Wrimare School Inc., a private school in Obando, Bulacan, Philippines

 Whole Slide Imaging, refers to scanning a complete microscope slide and creating a single high-resolution digital file.